SNC-80 is an opioid analgesic compound that selectively activates μ–δ opioid receptor heteromers and is used in scientific research. It was discovered in 1994.

SNC-80 was the first non-peptide compound developed that was regarded as a highly selective agonist for the δ-opioid receptor.
It has been shown to produce useful analgesic, antidepressant and anxiolytic effects in animal studies, but its usefulness is limited by producing convulsions at high doses, and so SNC-80 is not used medically, although it is a useful compound in scientific research.

References 

Opioids
Delta-opioid receptor agonists
Benzamides
Piperazines
Phenol ethers
Allyl compounds
Receptor heteromer ligands